Thorius, also known as minute salamanders, pigmy salamanders, or Mexican pigmy salamanders, is a genus of salamanders in the family Plethodontidae. They are endemic to Mexico and found in southern Veracruz and Puebla to Guerrero and Oaxaca.

Thorius is the most species-rich tropical salamander genus relative to its distribution area (Bolitoglossa and Pseudoeurycea have many more species but also much wider distribution areas). It is not uncommon for two or even three species to occur in the same place. In such cases, species have diverged in terms of body size and dentition, apparently facilitating niche differentiation.

Their extreme miniaturization is accompanied by determinate growth and skeletal reduction. Their skeleton also shows unique features, such as ossifications of many elements that remain cartilaginous in other salamanders. Consequently, they are easy to distinguish from other salamanders. In contrast, they tend to be similar in appearance, making it difficult to distinguish species. However, molecular genetic methods have greatly facilitated identification of new species.

Species
As of November 15, 2016, this genus is composed of the following 29 species:

References

 
Endemic amphibians of Mexico
Amphibian genera
Taxa named by Edward Drinker Cope
Taxonomy articles created by Polbot